Lars Wallentin (born 1943) is a Swedish physician and cardiologist. In 1998 he was the first recipient of the Nordic Medical Prize, the second largest medical award in the Nordic countries. He was elected as a member of the Royal Swedish Academy of Sciences in 2007. He has been described by the European Heart Journal as "an international superstar cardiologist."

He holds a doctorate in medicine from Linköping University in 1976 and is a full professor of cardiology at Uppsala University. He is one of the world's leading experts on unstable coronary artery disease, and one of the most highly cited cardiologists overall.

Honours
Nordic Medical Prize, 1998
Lars Werkö Prize, 2004
Member of the Royal Swedish Academy of Sciences, 2007

References

1943 births
Living people
Swedish cardiologists
Academic staff of Uppsala University
Members of the Royal Swedish Academy of Sciences